Nidasoshi  is a village in the northern state of Karnataka, India. It is located in the Hukeri taluk of Belgaum district in Karnataka.

Demographics
At the 2001 India census, Nidasoshi had a population of 6886 with 3801 males and 3085 females.

See also
 Belgaum
 Districts of Karnataka

References

External links
 http://Belgaum.nic.in/

Villages in Belagavi district